Konrad Srzednicki (1 November 1894 – 8 April 1993) was a Polish painter and printmaker. His work was part of the painting event in the art competition at the 1932 Summer Olympics.

References

1894 births
1993 deaths
20th-century Polish painters
20th-century Polish male artists
Olympic competitors in art competitions
People from Wysokie Mazowieckie
Polish male painters
Recipient of the Meritorious Activist of Culture badge